The 1971 South American Championships in Athletics  were held in Lima, Peru, between 9 and 17 October.

Medal summary

Men's events

Women's events

Medal table

External links
 Men Results – GBR Athletics
 Women Results – GBR Athletics
 Medallists

S
South American Championships in Athletics
Sports competitions in Lima
International athletics competitions hosted by Peru
1971 in South American sport
1971 in Peruvian sport
October 1971 sports events in South America
1970s in Lima